Bitecta murina is a moth of the subfamily Arctiinae. It was described by Franciscus J. M. Heylaerts in 1891. It is found on Java.

References

Lithosiini
Moths described in 1891